The West Virginian, train #23 and #24, was operated by the Baltimore and Ohio Railroad on a route from New York to Parkersburg, West Virginia. As with all B&O trains, the New York destination was a misnomer since trains never actually entered New York City. Instead, the B&O used the Central Railroad of New Jersey’s Jersey City Depot, which was directly across the river from New York.

For much of the route the West Virginian was a daylight train. Traveling overnight from New York, it left Washington, DC, in the early morning and made the 351-mile trip to Parkersburg in approximately five hours. This train was especially patronized on weekends as many Federal workers traveled home to West Virginia. Eastbound, the train was combined at Cumberland, Maryland, with either the Chicago - Washington Express or the Cleveland Night Express with through cars continuing on to New York. By 1954 the West Virginian was combined with the Cleveland Night Express westbound and was switched out at Cumberland for the trip to Parkersburg.

However, improving road conditions in West Virginia began taking its toll on ridership. Passenger counts fell and the train was extended to Cincinnati, Ohio. This was done to accommodate changes in the overall B&O schedule, including the discontinuance of the Diplomat on September 18, 1960. The Diplomat had brought large amount of head-end mail and express packages from Cincinnati, and without a means to move what was becoming the major revenue source for all trains, the B&O changed the schedule of the West Virginian. In fact, the West Virginian would be reconfigured several times in its life to accommodate the needs of the railroad and to appease politicians in West Virginia. In 1962, the train was renamed the Tri Stater, and received upgrades in equipment. However, this was not successful in attracting riders. Eventually, as losses mounted, the train was dropped on July 4, 1964.

References

Named passenger trains of the United States
Passenger trains of the Baltimore and Ohio Railroad
Passenger rail transportation in West Virginia
Railway services discontinued in 1964